Tyquin may refer to two Australian representative rugby league players who were brothers:

Bill Tyquin (1919–1999)
Tom Tyquin